Nelang or Nilang is a river valley of the Himalayas, containing a small eponymous village, in the Uttarkashi District of the state of Uttarakhand, India. It is close to the disputed Sino-Indian Line of Actual Control (LAC), and hence is also claimed by China as part of Zanda County of Ngari Prefecture of Tibet.

Some of the nearby villages are Dhumku in the west, and Jadhang (Sang) and Pulam Sumda in the northeast, all of which lie in the Jadh Ganga valley.

Geography 

The Jadh Ganga, an important tributary of the Bhagirathi River, flows through a narrow gorge flanked by steep cliffs. The gorge is called Jadh Ganga valley, and part of this valley near Nelang is called Nelang Valley.

Uttarkashi to India–China LAC route: 
NH-34 from Uttarkashi city in the south to Bhaironghati (west of Gangotri) in the north via Harsil is 90 km and runs along the Bhagirathi River in the Bhagirathi valley. The Bhagirathi River and its tributary Jadh Ganga converge at Bhaironghati. The limits of the Jadh Ganga valley and Jadh Ganga river are Bhaironghati in the southwest and Naga in the northeast. A 32–km–long road along the Jadh Ganga river in the Jadh Ganga valley runs from Bhaironghati to Naga via Dhumku, Hawa Bend (~4 km from Bhaironghati, so named because of strong winds, and also notorious for landslides as it is flanked by a sandy steep vertical cliff on one side and a deep river gorge on the other), Pagal Nala (literally the "Crazy Stream" – the local name of the Jadh Ganga River, so named as it is prone to sudden flash floods whenever it rains upstream), Hindoli Ghat (so named due to the feeling of hindola or "swing" experienced by passengers on the zigzag mountain ghat route), Nelang village, Mana a bridge over the Jadhang River, and finally reaches Naga ~6 km east of Nelang.

Naga - fork roads to Pulam Sumda / Sumla and Mendi Gad Glacier:
at Naga, where the road forks into two, is the confluence of two tributaries of the Jadh Ganga, the Jadhang River (Jadhang Gad) which originates from a glacier near Sumla/Pulam Sumda in the north and the Nilapani River (Nilapani Gad) which originates from a glacier north of Mana Pass to the east. Mana Pass is not reachable via this road as this route lies to the north of the mountain and glacier, which blocks it from the pass in the south.

Naga to Sumla road: 
Naga to Sumla, an ~34–km–long motorable road in the Jadhang river valley, goes via Dosindhu (literally "two rivers", ~3 km from Naga, a spur road from here goes towards Jadhang village in the northwest along the Jadhang rivulet while the main road along Jadhang Gad continues northeast to Pulam Sumdo), Jadhang Peak (5290 m, west of the road) and Sonam Peak (5262 m, east of the road), Tirpani (~20 km from Naga, converging with the Rangmach River (Rangmach Gad) from the northwest and the Jadhang Gad from the northeast), Pulam Sumda (~25 km from Naga), confluence of the Jadhang Gad from the north and the Mendi Gad (another fork route goes ~2 km east to Tsangchok, base camp of BSF), and finally Sumla near the LAC.

Naga to Mendi Gad Glacier road: 
Naga to Mana Pass, an ~25 to 30–km–long road in the Nilapani and Mendi Gad (also called the Mana Gad) valleys goes east via the Nilapani-Mendi confluence (~5 km from Naga, where the Nilapani Gad from the north meets the Mendi Gad from the east), the Mendi-Gull confluence ~13 km from Naga (where the Mendi Gad from the east meets the Gull Gad from a glacier in the south), and along the Mendi Gad River towards the Mendi Gad glacier near the LAC. The Mendi Gad glacier lies north of Mana Pass but remains unconnected with it due to the high mountain peaks.

ICBRs by BRO:
NHAI is responsible for maintaining NH-34, which travels to Bhaironghati and Gangotri. The rest of the motorable 
roads to Sumla/Pulam Sumda and Mana Pass at the LAC have been constructed by India's Border Roads Organisation (BRO) under phase-I of India-China Border Roads (ICBR).

History

Indo-Tibetan silk route 
Salt and silk were historically traded on this silk route. Pathan traders supposedly paid for the construction of this stairway in the 17th century. It was also a lesser known secret route of Hindu-Buddhist yatra (pilgrimage) to Mount Kailash.

Territorial dispute 
The valley of the Jadh Ganga is also claimed by China.

Gartang Gali stairway 
The Gartang Gali cliff-side hanging-stairway or Gartang Gali bridge, a 500-metre-long narrow wooden stairway hanging on the side of a vertical ridge at a height of 11,000 feet, lies in the narrow Nelang river valley of Jadh Ganga river canyon. After cutting a narrow horizontal U-shaped passage on the side of the monolithic cliff, the wooden structure was built inside it in the traditional native style. It offers great views of the Nelang valley and its ecology. It was initially supposedly constructed by the Pathan traders from Peshawar. Gartang Gali, a narrow and steep gorge, was once used as a Silk Road trade route between Tibet and India. After the 1962 Sino-Indian War, access to the area was prohibited by the Indian military, and consequently the bridge fell into disrepair. In 2015, after India opened these areas for tourism, the wooden stairway was repaired in the native traditional style and reopened in August 2021 after a gap of 59 years.

Culture
Nelang and Jadhang villages are inhabited by the Char Bhutia tribe, who practice Buddhism. During the 1962 Sino-Indian War, India evacuated these villages.

See also
 India-China Border Roads 
 Line of Actual Control
 List of disputed territories of India

References

Cities and towns in Uttarkashi district